Joe Don Duncan (born September 17, 1990) is a former American football tight end and fullback.  He played college football at Dixie State University. He was selected as a first-team player by the American Football Coaches Association on the 2013 Division II All-American team.

References

External links
 Denver Broncos bio
 Dixie State Trailblazers bio
 Notre Dame Riverside bio

Living people
1990 births
American football fullbacks
American football tight ends
Utah Tech Trailblazers football players
Sportspeople from Corona, California
Players of American football from California
Brooklyn Bolts players